Anissa Abi-Dargham, M.D. is an American psychiatrist and researcher. She is a psychiatry professor and vice-chair of research at Stony Brook University and professor emerita at the Columbia University College of Physicians and Surgeons.

She was previously the Chief of the Division of Translational Imaging in the Psychiatry Department at Columbia. She also served as Director of Clinical and Imaging Research in the Lieber Center for Schizophrenia Research, and Director of the Silvio O. Conte Center for the study of "Dopamine Dysfunction in Schizophrenia", both based at the New York State Psychiatric Institute.

Research 
Abi-Dargham has used molecular imaging techniques, such as single photon emission computed tomography (SPECT) and positron emission tomography (PET), to study the pathophysiology of schizophrenia, schizophrenia-related spectrum disorders, and addiction. With her collaborators, Abi-Dargham has done PET and fMRI studies on dopamine receptor density and network connectivity in both healthy individuals and patients with schizophrenia. Her work has resulted in seminal publications describing the complex alterations of dopamine transmission in schizophrenia and their relationship to clinical symptoms, cognition and response to treatment, as well as their interrelatedness to glutamate dysfunction in schizophrenia.

These studies showed increased striatal dopamine release in schizophrenia, which has become one of the most established findings of schizophrenia research and is now being tested as a biomarker for risk to develop schizophrenia in prodromal patients.

The work with cortical D1 receptor has provided added rationale for testing D1 agonists in schizophrenia. A new direction for work in her imaging group now is dual diagnosis patients with comorbid schizophrenia and cannabis abuse. She and her team found that most drug addictions blunt dopamine release during the chronic phase of drug dependence, which results in poor outcomes. In a popular interview, she explained, "The bottom line is that long-term, heavy cannabis use may impair the dopaminergic system, which could have a variety of negative effects on learning and behavior." Ultimately this work is relevant to developing biomarkers and more focused treatment interventions for these disorders.

Awards and honors 
Abi-Dargham has received numerous awards, and published over 165 articles in major scientific journals. She is the deputy editor of imaging for both neuropsychopharmacology and biological psychiatry, President of the American College of Neuropsychopharmacology, and former president of the Brain Imaging Council for the Society of Nuclear Medicine. Additionally, she has a large portfolio of federal, charitable and industry-funded studies.

In 2016, she was elected to membership in the National Academy of Medicine.

References

Living people
Columbia Medical School faculty
Stony Brook University faculty
Year of birth missing (living people)
Place of birth missing (living people)
Members of the National Academy of Medicine
American women psychiatrists
American psychiatrists
American women academics
21st-century American women